was a village located in Oki District, Shimane Prefecture, Japan.

As of 2003, the village had an estimated population of 2,132 and a density of 42.95 persons per km2. The total area was 49.64 km2.

On October 1, 2004, Tsuma, along with the town of Saigō, and the villages of Fuse and Goka (all from Oki District), was merged to create the town of Okinoshima.

Dissolved municipalities of Shimane Prefecture